The U.S. Interior Highlands is a mountainous region in the Central United States spanning northern and western Arkansas, southern Missouri, eastern Oklahoma, and extreme southeastern Kansas. The name is designated by the United States Geological Survey to refer to the combined subregions of the Ouachita Mountains south of the Arkansas River and the Ozark Plateaus north of the Arkansas. The U.S. Interior Highlands is one of few mountainous regions between the Appalachians and Rockies.

Geography
There are three distinct mountain ranges within the U.S. Interior Highlands:

The U.S. Interior Highlands is dominated by temperate broadleaf and mixed forests. Three national forests are located here: The Ouachita National Forest in Arkansas and Oklahoma; the Ozark-St. Francis National Forest in Arkansas; and the Mark Twain National Forest in Missouri.

Gallery

References

 
Mountain ranges of the United States
Physiographic regions of the United States
Mountain ranges of Arkansas
Mountain ranges of Kansas
Mountain ranges of Missouri
Mountain ranges of Oklahoma
Mark Twain National Forest
Ouachita Mountains
Ozarks
Ozark–St. Francis National Forest
Regions of Oklahoma
Regions of Arkansas
Regions of Kansas
Regions of Missouri
.01